Post Oak is an unincorporated community in Putnam County, Tennessee, United States.

Notes

Unincorporated communities in Putnam County, Tennessee
Unincorporated communities in Tennessee